FC Dnepr Mogilev (FK Dniapro Mahilyow) is a Belarusian football team, playing in the city of Mogilev. Their home stadium is Spartak Stadium.

History 
Dnepr Mogilev was founded in 1960 under the name Khimik Mogilev and began playing in the Class B (second tier league) of Soviet championship, which at the time consisted of over 140 teams split into several regional zones. In 1963, the team relegated to the third tier due to league structure reorganization and changed their name to Spartak Mogilev. In 1970, they dropped to the fourth tier, but the next year were brought back to the third, both times due to further league reorganizations. In 1973, the club adopted their current name, Dnepr Mogilev. Dnepr would spend all subsequent Soviet-era seasons in the third-tier league, with one exception. In 1982 Anatoly Baidachny led Dnepr to winning their zone and then the final round between the zone winners and to promotion to the Soviet First League. The club, however, wasn't able to maintain their second-tier spot and relegated again the next year.

In 1992, Dnepr joined the newly created Belarusian Premier League. The team's results in the post-Soviet years varied from being a runners-up in 1992 and champions in 1998 to the unfortunate relegation in 2011. Since then, Dnepr has come back and relegated again in 2014. As of 2015, Dnepr is playing in the Belarusian First League.

In spring 2019, the club merged with Premier League team Luch Minsk, citing the willingness keep the city of Mogilev represented in top flight. The united club was named Dnyapro Mogilev. It inherited Luch's Premier League spot and licence, their sponsorships and most of the squad, while keeping only a few of Dnepr players and relocating to Mogilev. Dnepr continued its participation in youth tournaments independently from Luch.

In 2020, Dnepr Mogilev reformed and joined the Second League, after Dnyapro Mogilev ceased to exist following their relegation from the Premier League.

Name changes 
1960: founded as Khimik Mogilev
1963: renamed to Spartak Mogilev
1973: renamed to Dnepr Mogilev
1998: absorbed Transmash Mogilev and renamed to Dnepr-Transmash Mogilev (Дняпро-Трансмаш, Dniapro-Transmash)
2006: renamed to Dnepr Mogilev
2019: merged with Luch Minsk into Dnyapro Mogilev

Honours 
 Belarusian Premier League
 Winners (1): 1998
 Runners-up (1): 1992
 3rd place (1): 2009
 Belarusian Cup
 Runners-up (1): 1992
 Belarusian First League
 Winners (1): 2012

Current squad 
As of March 2023

League and Cup history

Soviet Union 

1 Relegated due second level reduction from 10 zones (150 teams) in 1962 to a single group of 18 teams in 1963
2 Relegated as Class B changed its status from 3rd to 4th level in 1970, and the top two levels were reorganized into three with fewer teams.
3 Promoted due to 3rd level (Class A Second Group, renamed to Second League since next season) expansion from 3 to 6 territorial zones (from 66 to 124 teams) in 1971 and dismissal of 4th level.
4 In 1973, every draw was followed by a penalty shoot-out, with a winner gaining 1 point and loser gaining 0.

Belarus

Dnepr Mogilev in Europe

Managers 
 Anatoly Baidachny (30 November 1979 – 30 November 1984)
 Valery Streltsov (1986–93), (1994–95)
 Vladimir Kostyukov (1995)
 Valery Streltsov (1995–03), (2003 – 13 April 2006)
 Vladimir Kostyukov (11 April 2006 – 22 June 2007)
 Vladimir Brezhezinskiy (23 June 2007 – 22 July 2007)
 Valery Streltsov (23 July 2007 – 7 July 2008)
 Andrey Skorobogatko (8 July 2008 – 31 August 2011)
 Vyacheslav Geraschenko (3 September 2011 – 1 October 2013)
 Vladimir Kostyukov (2 October 2013 – 26 January 2014)
 Yury Lukashov (27 January 2014–)

References

External links 
Official website

 
Football clubs in Belarus
Sport in Mogilev
1960 establishments in Belarus
Association football clubs established in 1960